Valenciano may refer to:

Valenciano (surname)
Valencian language, the native language of the Valencian Community, Spain
Ratonero Valenciano, a Spanish dog breed
Río Valenciano, a river in Puerto Rico